Bukh is a Danish surname that may refer to the following notable people:
Arkady Bukh (born 1972), American criminal defense attorney
Jens Bukh, Danish car manufacturer, designer of Bukh & Gry
Julie Rydahl Bukh (born 1982), Danish football midfielder
Niels Bukh (1880–1950), Danish gymnast and educator

Danish-language surnames